Plymouth Marjon Football Club is a football club based in Plymouth, Devon.

History
Plymouth Marjon F.C. is the football section of Plymouth Marjon University. In 2015–16, the club won the Plymouth and West Devon League, and was promoted to the South West Peninsula League Division One West. At the end of 2018–19 the league was restructured, and Plymouth Marjon successfully applied for promotion to the Premier Division East, at Step 6 of the National League System.

Honours
Plymouth and West Devon League
Champions 2015–16

Players

Current squad

Current first team management

References

External links
Official website

50°25'09.9"N 4°06'44.0"W

Association football clubs established in 2008
2008 establishments in England
Football clubs in England
Football clubs in Devon
South West Peninsula League
University and college football clubs in England